Joseph F. Lyon (April 23, 1825 in Susquehanna County, Pennsylvania – 1902 in Elkhorn, Wisconsin) was a member of the Wisconsin State Assembly.

Biography
Lyon was born on April 23, 1825 in Susquehanna County, Pennsylvania. On July 26, 1854, he married Arimathea Jones. They had three children before her death on November 7, 1872. Later, Lyon married Amelia Dodge on December 10, 1873.

Career
Lyon was a member of the Assembly in 1868. Other positions he held include justice of the peace.

References

People from Susquehanna County, Pennsylvania
Members of the Wisconsin State Assembly
American justices of the peace
1825 births
1902 deaths
19th-century American politicians
19th-century American judges